The Roseville Bridge, is a pre-stressed concrete box girder road bridge that carries Warringah Road, part of the A38 across Middle Harbour, located adjacent to the suburb of , in Sydney, New South Wales, Australia. The bridge is one of two crossings of Middle Harbour, the other being the Spit Bridge.

Current bridge 
The suburbs east of Middle Harbour grew rapidly in the years following the opening of the inaugural Roseville Bridge. On 2 April 1966 the Liberal Premier Robin Askin, the Member for Collaroy at the time, later the Member for Pittwater, opened the current six-lane, high-level bridge. Along with the bridge, a significant upgrade of the approach roads was completed, which became the six-lane Warringah Road.

However, the adjacent Pipe Bridge has a clearance of only . This limitation, combined with only  depth of water, make it out of reach for most cruising vessels.

Today Roseville Bridge is part of a major thoroughfare from the Pacific Highway at Roseville to the Northern Beaches and suburbs east of Middle Harbour. Due to the halt of the construction of the Warringah Expressway across Middle Harbour to Wakehurst Parkway and the Burnt Bridge Creek Deviation, which is the only part of the Warringah Expressway built on the Northern Beaches by the Labor Wran government, there are today only two other major roads to these areas: Mona Vale Road, and Spit Road which crosses Middle Harbour downstream from Roseville Bridge using the Spit Bridge.

The road carries three lanes of traffic towards Roseville, and three lanes of traffic towards . A grade-separated shared pedestrian footpath and cycleway is located on the western side of the bridge.

On 8 March 2022 torrential rain and inadequate drainage led to the bridge being dubbed the new "Roseville Aqueduct" with images showing floating cars and water fall edge.

Former Roseville Bridge, 1924-1974 

An original bridge across Middle Harbour at Roseville was built jointly by the Willoughby, Ku-ring-gai and Warringah councils; with fifty percent of the funding provided by the NSW Government. It was built of reinforced concrete by unemployed returned servicemen and opened on 20 September 1924. It was claimed to be the first bridge supported on reinforced concrete piles. This low-level two-lane bridge was located downstream of the current bridge, and connected Babbage Road to what is today called Healey Way, which is the entrance to Davidson Park within Garigal National Park. The first bridge replaced an earlier ferry service consisting of rowing boats across the narrowest section of water.

The 1924 bridge survived the opening of the new bridge, and provided pedestrian access only, until it was demolished in 1974, along with Roseville Baths. Almost nothing remains from these structures.

See also

 List of bridges in Sydney

References

Bridges in Sydney
Bridges completed in 1924
Bridges completed in 1966
1966 establishments in Australia
Box girder bridges
Concrete bridges in Australia
Road bridges in New South Wales
Roseville, New South Wales
Frenchs Forest, New South Wales
1974 disestablishments in Australia